An exostosis, also known as a bone spur, is the formation of new bone on the surface of a bone. Exostoses can cause chronic pain ranging from mild to debilitatingly severe, depending on the shape, size, and location of the lesion. It is most commonly found in places like the ribs, where small bone growths form, but sometimes larger growths can grow on places like the ankles, knees, shoulders, elbows and hips. Very rarely are they on the skull.

Exostoses are sometimes shaped like spurs, such as calcaneal spurs.

Osteomyelitis, a bone infection, may leave the adjacent bone with exostosis formation. Charcot foot, the neuropathic breakdown of the feet seen primarily in diabetics, can also leave bone spurs that may then become symptomatic.

They normally form on the bones of joints, and can grow upwards. For example, if an extra bone formed on the ankle, it might grow up to the shin.

When used in the phrases "cartilaginous exostosis" or "osteocartilaginous exostosis", the term is considered synonymous with osteochondroma. Some sources consider the two terms to mean the same thing even without qualifiers, but this interpretation is not universal.

Osteophytes
Osteophytes are bone spurs that develop on the margins of joints secondary to external stimuli such as osteoarthritis. However, these are not always distinguished from exostoses in any definite way.

Fossil record

Evidence for exostosis found in the fossil record is studied by paleopathologists, specialists in ancient disease and injury. Exostosis has been reported in dinosaur fossils from several species, including Acrocanthosaurus atokensis, Albertosaurus sarcophagus, Allosaurus fragilis, Gorgosaurus libratus, and Poekilopleuron bucklandii.

Hereditary multiple exostoses
Hereditary multiple exostoses (HME), also called hereditary multiple osteochondromas (HMO), is a condition that is estimated to affect 1 in 50,000 individuals.  Multiple benign or noncancerous bone tumors develop in the affected individuals. The number and location vary among affected patients. Most people seem unaffected at birth; however, by the age of 12 years, they develop multiple exostoses. Affected individuals commonly complain of palpable and recognizable lumps (exostoses) at about the knees and in the forearms. The condition characteristically occurs bilaterally. It may lead to mild degrees of growth retardation and limb asymmetry. Genu valgum (commonly known as "knock-knees"), ankle valgus, and bowing and shortening of one or both of the forearm bones are common manifestations.

Types
 Buccal exostosis
 Footballer's ankle (exotosis of the ankle bone)
 Hereditary multiple exostoses (HME)
 Subungual exostosis
 Surfer's ear (exostosis of the ear canal)
 Torus mandibularis
 Torus palatinus
 Calcaneal spur (heel spur)

See also 
 Ganglion cyst
 List of radiographic findings associated with cutaneous conditions
 Osteoma
 Osteosclerosis
 Pachyosteosclerosis
 Pachyostosis

References

External links 

 The Ear and Balance Center, The Sonos Group
 MHE Research Foundation (Multiple Hereditary Exostoses)

Skeletal system

et:Kooljaluu
pt:Exostose